Active Power Inc. designs, manufactures, sells, and services flywheel-based uninterruptible power supply (UPS) products that use kinetic energy to provide short-term power as an alternative to conventional battery-based UPS products. The company also designs and manufactures modular devices that integrate critical power components into a pre-packaged, purpose built enclosure that can include Active Power’s UPS products as a component.

The company’s products are used in a number of industries including data centers, industrial/manufacturing, healthcare, transportation, broadcast, government, and casino/gaming. To date, Active Power has shipped more than 4,000 flywheels in UPS systems, delivering more than 1 gigawatt of critical backup power to customers in more than 50 countries around the world.

History

1992–2000 
 Active Power was founded in 1992 as Magnetic Bearing Technologies, Inc., where the company manufactured magnetic bearings for a variety of applications.
 In 1996, the company changed its name to Active Power and the following year introduced its first flywheel DC product.
 In 1999, Active Power deployed its first flywheel UPS product which fully integrates flywheel energy storage and power electronics.

2001–2009 
 In 2007, the company opened its APAC headquarters in China.

2010–present 
In 2010, The University of Texas at Austin chose to deploy Active Power UPS at its university data center.
 In 2011, Active Power shipped its 3,000th flywheel.
 In 2011, Active Power received a multimillion-dollar, multiple PowerHouse order from Hewlett-Packard.
 In 2012, Heineken selected Active Power to provide critical power protection at its bottling facility off the coast of Madagascar.
 In 2013, the company shipped its 4,000th flywheel including its next generation CleanSource HD UPS product.
 In 2014, Capgemini selected Active Power to provide critical power infrastructure for a UK data center expansion.
 In 2014, Verizon Terremark significantly expanded the power capacity of their Silicon Valley data center by deploying four PowerHouse units.
In 2016, it was acquired by Piller Power Systems. The new system with longer UPS runtime was launched.

External links 

 Active Power Official Website
 Piller Official Website
 LinkedIn Page

References 

Manufacturing companies based in Austin, Texas
Companies listed on the Nasdaq
Manufacturing companies established in 1992
1992 establishments in Texas